JRTC may refer to:

 James R. Thompson Center, a building in Chicago
 Joint Readiness Training Center, a U.S. Army training center at Fort Polk, Louisiana

Also may refer to John Roberts Theological College in Shillong, India, formerly known as John Roberts Theological Seminary